Etienne Green (born 19 July 2000) is an English professional footballer who plays as a goalkeeper for  club Saint-Étienne.

Club career 
Born in England to an English father and French mother, Green moved to France at the age of four.

After spending three years at ES Veauche, he joined youth academy of Saint-Étienne in 2009. He signed his first professional contract with the club in June 2020. Green made his professional debut on 4 April 2021 in a 2–0 league win against Nîmes, keeping a clean sheet and saving a penalty.

International career 
Born in England, Green has previously represented France at youth international level. On 24 May 2021, he received maiden call-up to France under-21 team for knockout stage of 2021 UEFA European Under-21 Championship. He was initially not included in the squad, but was named as a replacement for Alban Lafont who had to pull out of the squad to play Ligue 1 relegation/promotion play-offs with his club Nantes.

On 23 August 2021, it was reported that Green would switch his international allegiance to England, and four days later he was included in Lee Carsley's first U21 squad.

On 11 October 2021, Green made his U21 debut during a 1–0 2023 UEFA European Under-21 Championship qualification win away to Andorra.

Career statistics

References

External links 
 

2000 births
Living people
Sportspeople from Colchester
English footballers
French footballers
English emigrants to France
Association football goalkeepers
Ligue 1 players
Ligue 2 players
Championnat National 2 players
Championnat National 3 players
AS Saint-Étienne players
English people of French descent
French people of English descent
England under-21 international footballers